I'll Close My Eyes may refer to:
 "I'll Close My Eyes" (song), a 1945 song by Billy Reid
 I'll Close My Eyes (Doug Raney album), 1982
 I'll Close My Eyes (Mark Murphy album), 1991